Autumn: October in Algiers is a 1993 Algerian drama film directed by Malik Lakhdar-Hamina. The film was selected as the Algerian entry for the Best Foreign Language Film at the 67th Academy Awards, but was not accepted as a nominee.

Cast
 Malik Lakhdar-Hamina as Djihad
 Nina Koritz
 Merwan Lakhdar-Hamina as Momo
 Sid Ahmed Agoumi as Yazid
 François Bourcier as Edouard
 Mustapha El Anka as Zombretto
 Rachid Fares as Ramses

See also
 List of submissions to the 67th Academy Awards for Best Foreign Language Film
 List of Algerian submissions for the Academy Award for Best Foreign Language Film

References

External links
 

1993 films
1993 drama films
1990s French-language films
Algerian drama films